Ronald Odair de Oliveira Julião (born 16 June 1985) is a Brazilian track and field athlete who competes in the shot put and discus throw. He is a member of BM&F Bovespa's track club and is trained by João Paulo Alves da Cunha. He is the Brazilian record holder in the discus throw (65.55 m). He is the second highest ranked South American discus thrower after Jorge Balliengo and has won straight titles at the Brazil championships since 2005.

Julião is a five-time medallist in the discus at the South American Championships in Athletics and won the gold medal in the event in 2011 with a Championship record. He also won a silver medal in the shot put at the 2009 South American Championships. He won bronze medals in the discus at the Pan American Games and Summer Universiade in 2011.

Career

Early career
Born in Caieiras in Brazil's Sao Paulo state, Ronald Julião attended Sebastião de Oliveira Gusmão school and began training in the shot put from the age of thirteen. He won the Ibirapuera schools meet in 1999 and an athletics coach, Fatima Aparecida Germano, offered to train him as a result. She taught him in the shot put and also added the discus throw event to his oeuvre. In his first major regional competition he took third place in the shot put at the 2002 South American Youth Championships. He came sixth in the shot at the 2003 South American Junior Championships in Athletics, but showed progression in the discus by taking second place with a throw of 56.36 m. He signed up with the BM&F Bovespa club in 2005 and began to establish himself in the senior ranks that year.

First regional medals
He won his first national discus title in 2005 and took the bronze medal in the event at the 2005 South American Championships in Athletics, also finishing sixth in the shot put. The following year he was runner-up to Argentine athletes twice in the discus. At the 2006 South American Championships in Athletics he finished behind Jorge Balliengo, then at the 2006 South American Under-23 Championships in Athletics he was beaten by Germán Lauro. Outside of the region, he was eighth in the shot put and fourth in the discus at the 2006 Ibero-American Championships in Athletics. In Macau he won his first international shot put medal, taking the bronze at the 2006 Lusophony Games.

In the 2007 season Julião improved his personal bests to 59.75 m for the discus and 17.81 m for the shot put. He came fifth at the 2007 South American Championships in Athletics with his shot put effort and was runner-up to Lauro in the discus competition. He was further down the rankings at the 2007 Pan American Games held in Rio de Janeiro, taking tenth place in the shot and sixth in the discus. He cleared eighteen metres in the shot put for the first time in May 2008, throwing 18.12 m at the South American GP meet in Uberlândia. He won both throwing  national titles at the Brazilian Championships, but did not qualify for the 2008 Beijing Olympics. His sole international competition that year was the Ibero-American Championships, where he managed third in the discus.

Julião threw a shot put best of 18.19 m to take the silver medal at the 2009 South American Championships in Athletics – a performance that was better than that in his principal event, as he came third in the discus. Repeating his feat from three years previously, he came third in the shot at the 2009 Lusophony Games.

South American champion
He improved significantly as an athlete in the 2010 season. Under the advice of José Luis Martínez, a Spanish throwing coach, he had changed the focus of his training, moving away from building strength and towards technique-based methods. Clearing sixty metres in the discus for the first time, he opened the year with a Brazilian record of 60.40 m, beating José Araujo de Souza's mark which has stood since 1990. He broke the record three more times that year, culminating in a throw of 63.09 m at the Meeting de Atletismo Madrid. He also became the national indoor record holder in the shot put with a throw of 17.51 m. There were no major international competitions for Julião that year, but he placed fifth in the shot and sixth in the discus at the 2010 Ibero-American Championships. He improved his indoor shot put record to 17.94 m at the start of 2011. He was fourth in that event at the 2011 South American Championships in Athletics, but performed well in the discus by taking his first ever continental gold medal with a Championship record throw of 62.72 m. Still studying at university, his form peaked for the 2011 Summer Universiade held in Shenzhen. He broke the outdoor national record in the shot put with a throw of 18.78 m (coming ninth) and improved his discus mark to 63.30 m to leave the competition with the bronze medal. His last appearance for Brazil that year came at the 2011 Pan American Games, where he won another discus bronze medal.

Julião threw 65.41 m at the Grande Premio Brasil Caixa de Atletismo in May 2012, lifting him into second place on the all-time South American discus rankings behind Jorge Balliengo.

Personal bests
Shot put: 18.78 m –  Shenzhen, 16 August 2011
Discus throw: 65.55 m –  La Jolla, California, 27 April 2013

Competition record

*: At the 2006 Ibero-American Championships, Ronald Julião as initially 4th, but Argentinian Marcelo Pugliese was disqualified because of doping violations.
**: Competing out of competition.

National titles
Discus throw: 2005 to 2015 (11)
Shot put: 2008 to 2011 (4)

References

External links

Living people
1985 births
Brazilian male discus throwers
Brazilian male shot putters
Sportspeople from São Paulo (state)
Athletes (track and field) at the 2012 Summer Olympics
Athletes (track and field) at the 2007 Pan American Games
Athletes (track and field) at the 2011 Pan American Games
Athletes (track and field) at the 2015 Pan American Games
Olympic athletes of Brazil
World Athletics Championships athletes for Brazil
Pan American Games silver medalists for Brazil
Pan American Games bronze medalists for Brazil
Pan American Games medalists in athletics (track and field)
Universiade medalists in athletics (track and field)
South American Games silver medalists for Brazil
South American Games medalists in athletics
Competitors at the 2006 South American Games
Competitors at the 2014 South American Games
Universiade gold medalists for Brazil
Universiade bronze medalists for Brazil
Medalists at the 2011 Summer Universiade
Medalists at the 2013 Summer Universiade
Medalists at the 2011 Pan American Games
Medalists at the 2015 Pan American Games
21st-century Brazilian people